Neapolis was a Greek city in ancient Thrace, located on the Propontis. It also bore the name Heraclea or Herakleia (Ἡράκλεια). It was a member of the Delian League and appears in Athenian tribute registers between 442/1 and 430/29 BCE.

Its site is located near modern Eriklice Köyü (Erikli), Şarköy/Tekirdağ.

See also
Greek colonies in Thrace

References

Populated places in ancient Thrace
Former populated places in Turkey
Greek colonies in Thrace
Members of the Delian League
History of Tekirdağ Province